is a Japanese professional tennis player.

She has career-high WTA rankings of 283 in singles, achieved on 29 January 2018, and 131 in doubles, set on 3 February 2020.

Kaji won her biggest ITF title to date at the 2019 Challenger de Granby, in the doubles tournament, partnering Ingrid Neel.

ITF Circuit finals

Singles: 10 (6 titles, 4 runner–ups)

Doubles: 10 (6 titles, 4 runner–ups)

References

External links
 
 

1994 births
Living people
People from Okayama Prefecture
Sportspeople from Okayama Prefecture
Japanese female tennis players
Universiade medalists in tennis
Universiade bronze medalists for Japan
Medalists at the 2017 Summer Universiade
20th-century Japanese women
21st-century Japanese women